Seyyed Farid Mousavi is an Iranian reformist politician who is currently a member of the Parliament of Iran representing Tehran, Rey, Shemiranat and Eslamshahr electoral district.

Career

Electoral history

References

Union of Islamic Iran People Party politicians
Living people
Members of the 10th Islamic Consultative Assembly
Year of birth missing (living people)